NGC 338 is a spiral galaxy in the constellation Pisces. It was discovered in 1877 by Wilhelm Tempel. It was described by Dreyer as "very faint, very small, irregular figure, brighter middle."

References

External links
 

0338
Astronomical objects discovered in 1877
Pisces (constellation)
Spiral galaxies